Sloan Vernon "George" Washington (June 4, 1907 – February 17, 1985) was a professional baseball outfielder.

Washington's minor league baseball career spanned twenty seasons, from  until . He served as player-manager of the Texarkana Bears of the Big State League in 1947-48. In , while playing for the Gladewater Bears, Washington won the Class-C East Texas League batting title at age 42.

Sources

Major League Baseball outfielders
Chicago White Sox players
McCook Generals players
Baton Rouge Senators players
Shreveport Sports players
Fort Worth Cats players
Indianapolis Indians players
St. Paul Saints (AA) players
Texarkana Bears players
Gladewater Bears players
Dallas Eagles players
Minor league baseball managers
Baseball players from Texas
People from Linden, Texas
1907 births
1985 deaths